General of the Armies John Joseph "Black Jack" Pershing (September 13, 1860 – July 15, 1948) was a senior United States Army officer. His most famous post was when he served as the commander of the American Expeditionary Force (AEF) on the Western Front in World War I, 1917–18.

Pershing was immensely popular after World War I, and as a result a large number of organizations, equipment, streets and buildings are named after him throughout the United States and abroad:

Organizations
 The National Society of Pershing Rifles, founded by Pershing, continues on today as America's premier undergraduate military fraternal organization. He also founded the Military Order of the World Wars.
 The 2nd Brigade of the 1st Cavalry Division (United States) is nicknamed "Black Jack."
 The 4th Squadron of the 10th US Cavalry, part of the 4th Infantry Division's 3rd Brigade Combat Team, is nicknamed the Blackjack Squadron
 B Troop (Black Jack Troop) 5/15 Cavalry Regiment at Fort Knox, Kentucky, the home of Armor and Cavalry where brand new 19D Cavalry Scouts are trained. A parade field in front of the B Troop barracks is called "Pershing Field" in honor of the General, and a placard of his works lies in its corner.

Military ordnance and other equipment
 The M26 Pershing tank  was an American armored vehicle introduced in 1945.
 The Pershing missile systems
 In 1938, the Chicago, Burlington and Quincy Railroad named a diesel engined streamliner train the General Pershing Zephyr.

Buildings

Schools

Elementary schools
Berwyn, Illinois; Joliet, Illinois; West Milwaukee, Wisconsin; Muskogee, Oklahoma; Lincoln, Nebraska; Killeen, Texas (Fort Hood); Orangevale, California; Dallas, Texas; Saint Joseph, Missouri; Orlando, Florida; Fort Meade, Maryland; University City, Missouri, Daly City, California

Middle schools
Houston, Texas; Springfield, Missouri; Sunset Park, Brooklyn, New York City; San Diego, California

High schools
Detroit, Michigan

College buildings
 Pershing Arena, Pershing Society, Pershing Hall, and the Pershing Scholarships of Truman State University in Kirksville, Missouri (Pershing's former college)
 Pershing Barracks at the United States Military Academy. Completed in 1895 as the Academic Building for West Point, it was renamed the West Academic Building in 1913. It was later converted to a barracks and renamed Pershing Barracks.
 John J. Pershing Military and Naval Science Building of University of Nebraska–Lincoln
 Pershing Hall of Montana State University – Northern in Havre, Montana
 Pershing Hall, part of the University of Missouri, Columbia, Missouri
 Pershing Walk, a campus street at Culver Military Academy, Culver, Indiana

Military buildings
 Pershing Hall in The Presidio of San Francisco in San Francisco, California
 Pershing Hall on Governors Island in New York Harbor
 Pershing Community Center, Fort Leonard Wood, Missouri
 Pershing House in Fort Sam Houston, San Antonio, Texas

Other buildings
 The Pershing Center, a multi-purpose arena in downtown Lincoln, Nebraska
 The Pershing Building in Kansas City, Missouri, located on Pershing Road
 The John J. Pershing VA Medical Center, in Poplar Bluff, Missouri.
 Pershing Memorial Hospital in Brookfield Missouri
 The Pershing Hall in Paris, France.
 Pershing Memorial Hospital in Brookfield, Missouri

Places

Streets
 Pershing or General Pershing Avenue: St. Louis, Missouri (previously known as Berlin Avenue); Fort Riley, Kansas; Phoenix, Arizona; Cleveland, Ohio;  Stockton, California; Orlando, Florida; San Jose, California; Orangevale, California; Davenport, Iowa; Ocean Springs, Mississippi; Fort Worth, Texas; Rensselaer, New York; Milltown, New Jersey; Lancaster, Pennsylvania;  Leechburg, Pennsylvania; Salem, Ohio
 Avenida General Pershing in the San Isidro District of Lima, Peru
 Pershing or General Pershing Boulevard: North Little Rock, Arkansas, Oklahoma City, Oklahoma (on the Oklahoma State Fairgrounds, formerly part of Main Street); Cheyenne, Wyoming (a main road to Warren AFB); Kenosha, Wisconsin
 Boulevard Pershing on the western edge of Paris, France runs past the Palais des Congrès near the Porte Maillot. Many of the major streets in the area (the 16th arrondissement) are named after notable French military figures, including Avenue Foch, named after Marshal Foch, and at either end of Boulevard Pershing, streets named after the Marshals of France Gouvion Saint-Cyr and Koenig. It reflects the immense popularity of the American troops who first arrived in the French capital in 1916.
 Boulevard John-Joseph Pershing in Limpertsberg, Luxembourg
 Pershing or General Pershing Drive: El Paso, Texas; North Omaha, Nebraska; Florence, Nebraska; Arlington, Virginia; Arlington National Cemetery; El Segundo/Playa del Rey, California; Decatur, Illinois; Derby, Connecticut; Silver Spring, Maryland;San Diego, California
 Pershing Road (Weehawken) in Weehawken, New Jersey
 Pershing or General Pershing Road: Chicago (formerly 39th Street); Kansas City, Missouri (the northern border to the Liberty Memorial, the Official National World War I Memorial); Fort Bliss, Texas
 Pershing or General Pershing Street: Houston; New Orleans (in the uptown section); Hamden, Connecticut; Hammond, Louisiana; Portland, Oregon; Cranston, Rhode Island

Squares and plazas
 Pershing Square in downtown Los Angeles
 Pershing Square in New York City on 42nd Street at Park Avenue in front of Grand Central Terminal
 Plaza Pershing in Zamboanga City, Philippines

Parks
 Pershing Point Park in Atlanta, Georgia (opened in 1920)
 Pershing Field Memorial Park in Jersey City, New Jersey (opened in 1922)
 Pershing Park in Washington, D.C. features the Pershing Memorial
 Pershing State Park, in north-central Missouri between Laclede and Meadville
 Pershing Park in Minneapolis, Minnesota, Racine, Wisconsin and Arkansas City, Kansas
 Pershing Field in Fort Carson, Colorado
 Stade Pershing, a baseball park in Paris, France

Other places
 Pershing County, Nevada
 Mount Pershing, in the Olympic Mountains of Washington (state)

Miscellaneous
 A riderless horse was named in honor of Pershing, "Black Jack". This horse was used for many years in funerals for heads of state, including President John F. Kennedy.
 The Pershing Division of the Clarence Cannon Conference, a high school athletic conference in Northeastern Missouri in the area where the general lived during his youth. The other division in the conference honors Harry S. Truman.
 The John J. Pershing Grille is a casual dining room at the University Club of Washington, DC.  Pershing, a member of the Club, dedicated its current clubhouse, located at 1135 Sixteenth Street, in 1921.
 The Great Pershing Balloon Derby at Brookfield, Missouri is named in his honor and is held over the Labor Day weekend each year.
 General Pershing, a British racehorse that took part in the 1995 Grand National Steeplechase.

References

Lists of things named after people